The 'neither one nor many' argument (Wylie: gcig du 'bral ba'i gtan tshigs) is an argument employed by different philosophers and spiritual traditions for various reasons. The argument and its permutations and antecedents, particularly the "problem of the One and the Many" as charted by McEvilley (2002: pp. 23–66) has an ancient pedigree in the lineages of both Indian philosophy and Greek philosophy. McEvilley (2002) also provides arguments inferring the mutual influence and mutual iteration of the ancient Indian and Greek philosophical traditions. The argument is a factor in the algorithmic function of the Catuskoti. In its Buddhist employ, the argument is one of a suite of arguments within the purview of Pramana and Indian logic to demonstrate and test various doctrines.  Different authorities and sources provide different enumerations of these said arguments; Khenpo Yonten Gyamtso lists them thus:
 'diamond splinters' argument (Wylie: rdo rje gzegs ma'i gtan tshigs)
 'refutation of production of existent and nonexistent effects' (Wylie: yod med skye 'gog gi gtan tshigs)
 'refutation of production related to four possible alternatives' (Wylie: mu bzhi skye ba'i gtan tshigs)
 'dependent arising' argument (Wylie: rten 'brel gyi gtan tshigs)
 argument of 'neither one nor many' (Wylie: gcig du 'bral ba'i gtan tshigs)

The Padmakara Translation Group (2005: p. 39) convey the uniqueness of the Madhyamākalaṃkāra of Śāntarakṣita in Buddhist literature in its focused, dedicated and protracted employ of the "neither one nor many" argument:
The Madhyamakalankara invokes the argument of "neither one nor many" more intensively (throughout sixty-two of its ninety-seven stanzas) than any other text in Buddhist literature. This argument is one of a series of proofs used to demonstrate that phenomena are without real existence.

Notes

References
 Murthy, K. Krishna. Buddhism in Tibet. Sundeep Prakashan (1989) .
 Doctor, Thomas H. (trans.) Mipham, Jamgon Ju.(author)(2004).  Speech of Delight: Mipham's Commentary of Shantarakshita's Ornament of the Middle Way. Ithaca: Snow Lion Publications.    
 Shantarakshita (author); Mipham (commentator); Padmakara Translation Group (translators)(2005). The Adornment of the Middle Way: Shantarakshita's Madhyamakalankara with commentary by Jamgön Mipham. Boston, Massachusetts, USA: Shambhala Publications, Inc.  (alk. paper)
 Banerjee, Anukul Chandra. Acaraya Santaraksita in Bulletin of Tibetology, New Series No. 3, p. 1-5. (1982). Gangtok, Sikkim Research Institute of Tibetology and Other Buddhist Studies. 
Blumenthal, James. The Ornament of the Middle Way: A Study of the Madhyamaka Thought of Shantarakshita. Snow Lion, (2004).  - a study and translation of the primary Gelukpa commentary on Shantarakshita's treatise: Gyal-tsab Je's Remembering  The Ornament of the Middle Way. 
 Prasad, Hari Shankar (ed.). Santaraksita, His Life and Work.  (Collected Articles from "All India Seminar on Acarya Santaraksita" held on August 3–5, 2001 at Namdroling Monastery, Mysore, Karnataka). New Delhi, Tibet House, (2003).
Jha, Ganganath (trans.) The Tattvasangraha of Shantaraksita with the Commentary of Kamalashila. 2 volumes. First Edition : Baroda, (G.O.S. No. Lxxxiii) (1939). Reprint ; Motilal Banarsidass, Delhi, (1986). 
Phuntsho, Karma. Mipham's Dialectics and Debates on Emptiness: To Be, Not to Be or Neither. London: RoutledgeCurzon  (2005) 

Madhyamaka
Buddhist logic